Waja (also known as Waja Temuga) is a town in northern Ethiopia. It is one of two towns in Alamata woreda.

Records at the Nordic Africa Institute website provide details of the primary school in 1968.

Based on figures from the Central Statistical Agency in 2005, Waja has an estimated total population of 11,020, of whom 5,373 are men and 5,647 are women. The 1994 census reported it had a total population of 6,050, of whom 2,732 were men and 3,318 were women. The majority(98%) of inhabitants are Amharic speaking Amhara, Afar and Agew people who believe in the identity of  Wollo. There are a scanty number of Tigrigna(the working language of the regional state) speaking residents.

Notes 

Populated places in the Tigray Region